Port-Launay is a commune in the Finistère department of Brittany in north-western France.

Population
Inhabitants of Port-Launay are called in French Port-Launistes.

See also
Communes of the Finistère department
Parc naturel régional d'Armorique

References

External links

Official website 

Mayors of Finistère Association 

Communes of Finistère